The 2008 Dartmouth Big Green football team was an American football team that represented Dartmouth College during the 2008 NCAA Division I FCS football season. The Big Green finished last in the Ivy League.

In its fourth consecutive season under head coach Eugene "Buddy" Teevens (his ninth overall), the team compiled an 0–10 record and was outscored 343 to 129. Dartmouth averaged 5,096 fans per game.Andrew Dete, Alex Rapp and Milan Williams were the team captains. 

The Big Green's winless (0–7) conference record was the worst in the Ivy League standings. Dartmouth was outscored 223 to 77 by Ivy opponents. 

Dartmouth played its home games at Memorial Field on the college campus in Hanover, New Hampshire.

Schedule

References

Dartmouth
Dartmouth Big Green football seasons
Dartmouth Football
College football winless seasons